Macao Civic Power, or in short Civic Power, is a centrist and liberal political party in Macau.

History 
Macao Civic Power was founded on 28 September 2008, although official documents showed the organisation was registered early on 3 July 2006. They first ran in the 2009 Legislative Assembly election under the name of "Civic Watch" but did not win any seats, and the same for 2013 election.

In 2017 election, chairwoman Agnes Lam was elected to the legislature. However, her 2021 re-election bid failed, ending the party representation in the Legislative Assembly.

Elections performance

Legislative Assembly elections

Elected members 
 Agnes Lam Iok-fong, 2017–2021

References 

Political parties in Macau
2008 establishments in Macau
Political parties established in 2008